Chalcidini is a wasp tribe in subfamily Chalcidinae.

References

 Andrade de, T.V. & M.T. Tavares 2009: Revision of Ceyxia Girault, stat. rev. (Hymenoptera, Chalcididae, Brachymeriini). Revista Brasileira de Entomologia 53 (4): 511-548

External links
 

Chalcidoidea
Parasitica tribes